Mesi Bridge ( "The bridge in the middle") is a bridge in the village of Mes, about  (as the crow flies) northeast of Shkodër, in northwestern Albania. It is a monument of Postribë culture, turning the site into a tourist attraction with a lot of visitors from all around the world. For foreigners the architecture of the bridge is intriguing with round slick stones and stone plates. The surrounding panorama gives the bridge an even more picturesque view. The Albanian Development Fund invested 13 million lekë so the tourists could step on the bridge and watch it closely because there was no entry way to the bridge.

It was built in the 18th century, around 1770, by Kara Mahmud Bushati, the local Ottoman pasha, and spans the Kir River. The building was divided in 2 phases where the first phase was only the middle arc and the arc near it and the second phase included the other 11 arches. The purpose was to connect the city of Shkodër with the city of Drisht and other cities of the northern side. It is 108m long, 3.4 meters wide, 12.5 meters high with 13 arches, and is one of the longest examples of an Ottoman bridge in the region. It was built as part of the road that goes up the Kir Valley, eventually to Pristina.

Today the bridge is at risk, having been damaged over time by devastating floods, which have resulted in floodwaters cutting away at the arches on the right side, causing cracking.

Gallery

References

External links
ALBANIA-The Mesi Bridge at Shkodra on the Kir river

Bridges completed in 1770
Ottoman bridges in Albania
Buildings and structures in Shkodër
Tourist attractions in Shkodër
Pedestrian bridges in Albania
1770 establishments in the Ottoman Empire
Stone arch bridges